The Alaska State House of Representatives is the lower house in the Alaska Legislature, the state legislature of the U.S. state of Alaska. The House is composed of 40 members, each of whom represents a district of approximately 17,756 people per 2010 Census figures.  Members serve two-year terms without term limits. With 40 representatives, the Alaska House is the smallest state legislative lower chamber in the United States. The House convenes at the State Capitol in Juneau.

Powers and process
Members of the Alaska House of Representatives are responsible for a portion of the process of making and amending state law. The first step of the legislative process is filing a bill by giving it to the chief clerk of the Alaska House of Representatives. The chief clerk will then assign bills a number.

Bills are introduced and read the first time with the number, sponsor or sponsors, and the title of the bill and then referred to a committee(s). Committee chairs can choose whether or not hear a bill and committees can vote to approve a bill in its original form or make modifications through a committee substitute. Once bills or substitutes are approved, the legislation is referred to the next committee of assignment or to the Rules Committee, which can further amend the bill or assign it to the daily floor calendar.

Once a bill is scheduled on the floor, it appears on the calendar in Second Reading. The bill is again read by number, sponsor or sponsors, and title along with the standing committee reports. A motion is made on the floor to adopt any committee substitutes. Amendments can also be offered and voted on. Third Reading is where the motion is made to vote on the bill.

Senate action
After final passage in the Alaska House of Representatives, a bill is engrossed and sent to the Alaska Senate to go through the same process of introduction, committee referral and three readings. Likewise, bills that have been approved on Third Reading in the Alaska Senate are engrossed and sent to the Alaska House of Representatives.

Enrollment or conference
When a bill is not modified in the second house, it can be sent to the governor on Third Reading, through enrollment. If the bill is modified, the house of origin must vote to accept or reject amendments by the opposite house. A Fourth Reading, in the case of acceptance, will send the bill to the governor, through enrollment. If amendments are rejected, the bill can be sent to conference, where members of the Senate and House hash out a final version and send it to a Fourth Reading in both houses.

Governor and veto override
The governor can choose to sign or veto the legislation. In the case of the veto, a two-thirds majority of a joint session can override the veto. An appropriations bill requires a three-fourths majority vote in a joint session to override a veto. If signed or approved by a veto override, the legislation becomes law.

Membership

Terms and qualifications
State representatives must be a qualified voter and resident of Alaska for no less than three years, and a resident of the district from which elected for one year immediately preceding filing for office. A state representative must be 21 years of age at the time the oath of office is taken. The Alaska House of Representatives may expel a member with the concurrence of two-thirds of the membership of the house.

Legislative terms begin on the second Monday in January following a presidential election year and on the third Tuesday in January following a gubernatorial election. State representatives serve for terms of two years.

Leadership

The Speaker of the House presides over the House of Representatives. The Speaker is elected by the majority party caucus followed by confirmation of the full House through the passage of a House Resolution. In addition to presiding over the body, the Speaker is also the chief leadership position, and controls the flow of legislation and committee assignments. Other House leaders, such as the majority and minority leaders, are elected by their respective party caucuses relative to their party's strength in the chamber.

Current composition

The 23 member majority caucus consists of 19 Republicans, 2 independents and 2 Democrats from the Bush Caucus. The 16 member minority caucus consists of 12 Democrats, 3 independents and 1 Republican. Representative David Eastman is not a member of either caucus. 

Past partisan compositions can be found on Political party strength in Alaska.

Committees
Current committees include:

 Judiciary
 Resources
 State Affairs
 Economic Development, Trade, Tourism, and the Arctic
 Fisheries
 Committee on Committees
 Task Force on Sustainable Education
 Community & Regional Affairs
 Education
 Energy
 Military & Veterans' Affairs
 Health & Social Services
 Labor & Commerce
 Transportation
 Rules
 Finance
 Education & Early Development
 Governor
 Labor & Workforce Development
 Health & Social Services
 Legislature
 Military & Veterans' Affairs
 Natural Resources
 Public Safety
 Revenue
 Transportation & Public Facilities
 University Of Alaska
 Administration
 Commerce, Community & Economic Dev
 Corrections
 Court System
 Environmental Conservation
 Fish & Game
 Law
 Fiscal Policy

Current members (33rd Alaska State Legislature)

Past composition of the House of Representatives

See also

 Alaska Senate
 Alaska State Capitol
 List of Alaska State Legislatures

Notes

References

External links
 Alaska Legislature
 Alaska House Republicans House Republicans website
 Alaska House Majority Coalition Majority Coalition website (Coalition of Democrats, Independents and Republicans)

House
State lower houses in the United States